SS Zhongshan, formerly romanized as , was a Chinese gunboat built in Japan in 1913. Zhongshan was sunk by the Imperial Japanese Navy during the Second Sino-Japanese War, but was later raised and restored as a museum ship in Wuhan.

Construction
SS Yongfeng was the first of fours ordered from Mitsubishi by the Qing Empire in 1910. Under the deal signed between the Qing naval minister Prince Rui, his deputy Admiral Sa Zhenbing, and the Japanese, the first two ships (including Yongfeng) would be built in Japan, while the second two would be built in China at Jiangnan Shipyard with Japanese technical assistance.

Service history 

Yongfeng entered service as part of the Beiyang Fleet. In March 1913, it sailed to Shanghai, where it was based at Yuezhou.

It sailed south with Sun Yat-sen in July 1917, subsequently forming part of the Nationalist navy at Canton (now known as Guangzhou).

Just prior to Ye Ju's attack of the presidential palace on 16 June 1922, Sun Yat-sen fled to the Guangzhou naval yard and took refuge aboard the cruiser  (then Hai Ch'i). From there, he transferred to the  where he was joined by Chiang Kai-shek around the 27th or 29th. Yongfeng and other ships then fought past Pearl River fortresses controlled by Chen Jiongming while launching assaults and negotiating with the Guangzhou leadership for about 50 days. It avoided reprisals by anchoring off Huangpu, surrounded by foreign vessels Chen could not risk firing upon. Finally, Sun and Chiang left aboard a British ship to Hong Kong on 9 August, whence they departed for Shanghai. The  carried Sun and his wife to Hong Kong in November 1924.

On 13 April 1925, the ship was renamed in honor of Sun Yat-sen, better known in China as "Sun Zhongshan", following his death the previous month.

In November 1925, the Nationalist navy was placed under the direction of the Soviet adviser Andrei S. Bubnov, who named the Communist Li Zhilong as its head. The voyage of Zhongshan and Baobi from Guangzhou to Huangpu (Whampoa) on 18 March 1926 set off the Canton Coup.

She patrolled the southern coasts of China against pirates after the Northern Expedition, and she rescued the steamship Xinhua in 1928.

In the Second Sino-Japanese War,  participated in the Battle of Wuhan. On 24 October 1938, she was bombed and sunk in the Yangtze River by the Imperial Japanese Navy with 25 casualties, including Captain Sa Shijun, a nephew of Sa Zhenbing.

Recovery

Hubei's provincial cultural department received permission to plan the recovery of Zhongshan in 1986, and the wreck was salvaged from the Yangtze on 28 January 1997. By 2001, it was restored to its appearance , except for some of the damage which it sustained when the ship was sunk in 1938. The restored Zhongshan is now located in the Zhongshan Warship Museum in Wuhan. The facility has been described as "China's first floating museum".

The museum is located in Jinkou Subdistrict of Wuhan's suburban Jiangxia District, some 25 km southwest of downtown Wuchang. In 2003, relics from the ship were also displayed at Hong Kong's Museum of Coastal Defense.

Gallery

See also
 Sun Yat-sen, an American Liberty ship
 , a replica of this ship was constructed which operates as a museum ship in Weihai.

References

Citations

Bibliography
 .
 .

External links

 

1912 ships
Zhongshan
Naval ships of the Republic of China
Shipwrecks in rivers
Gunboats of China
Second Sino-Japanese War naval ships of China
Maritime incidents in 1938
World War II naval ships of China
Ships of the Republic of China Navy
Gunboats sunk by aircraft
Ships sunk by Japanese aircraft
Museum ships in China
National first-grade museums of China